The Burmeso language – also known as Taurap – is spoken by some 300 people in Burmeso village along the mid Mamberamo River in Mamberamo Tengah subdistrict, Mamberamo Raya Regency, Papua province, Indonesia. It is surrounded by the Kwerba languages to the north, the Lakes Plain languages to the south, and the East Cenderawasih Bay languages to the west.

Burmeso forms a branch of Malcolm Ross's family of East Bird's Head – Sentani languages, but had been considered a language isolate by Stephen Wurm and William A. Foley. The language has very distinct grammatical structure.  It has SOV word order.

Phonology

Probable sound changes proposed by Foley (2018):
 *p > /ɸ/
 *tʃ > /s/

Pronouns
Burmeso independent pronouns are:
{| 
!  !! sg !! du !! pl
|-
! 1
| da || day || boro
|-
! 2
| ba ||  || bito
|}

Nouns
Burmeso has six noun classes, which are:
{| 
! class !! semantic category
|-
| class 1 || male humans and associated things (contains half of all nouns)
|-
| class 2 || female humans and associated things
|-
| class 3 || body parts, insects, and lizards; material culture like axes and canoes, some foods; many natural phenomena
|-
| class 4 || mass nouns
|-
| class 5 || the two staple foods: sago tree and banana
|-
| class 6 || arrows, coconuts, and rice (traded items)
|}

Burmeso nouns have three genders: masculine, feminine, and neuter. Singular concordial suffixes are:

-ab ‘masculine’
-an ‘feminine’
-ora ‘neuter’

Examples of nominal concordial suffixes in usage:

Basic vocabulary
Basic vocabulary of Burmeso (singular and plural nominal forms) listed in Foley (2018):

{| 
|+ Burmeso basic vocabulary
! gloss !! singular !! plural
|-
| ‘bird’ || tahabo || tohwodo
|-
| ‘blood’ || sar || sarido
|-
| ‘bone’ || hiwraf || himaruro
|-
| ‘breast’ || mom || momut
|-
| ‘ear’ || ara || 
|-
| ‘eat’ || bomo || 
|-
| ‘egg’ || kahup || kohuro
|-
| ‘eye’ || anar || anuro
|-
| ‘fire’ || hor || horemir
|-
| ‘give’ || i ~ o || 
|-
| ‘hair’ || ihna || ihiro
|-
| ‘leg’ || ago || agoro
|-
| ‘louse’ || hati || 
|-
| ‘man’ || tamo || dit
|-
| ‘name’ || ahau || 
|-
| ‘one’ || neisano || 
|-
| ‘see’ || ihi || 
|-
| ‘stone’ || ako || hiruro
|-
| ‘sun’ || misiabo || misiado
|-
| ‘tooth’ || arawar || araruro
|-
| ‘tree’ || haman || hememido
|-
| ‘water’ || baw || bagaruro
|-
| ‘woman’ || nawak || nudo
|}

Many Burmeso nouns display irregular and suppletive plural forms.

{| 
! gloss !! singular !! plural
|-
| ‘man’ || tamo || dit
|-
| ‘banana’ || mibo || mirar
|-
| ‘dog’ || jamo || juwdo
|-
| ‘pig’ || sibo || sirudo
|-
| ‘white cockatoo’ || ayab || ayot
|-
| ‘house’ || konor || konodo
|-
| ‘mat’ || wira || wirasamir
|}

The following basic vocabulary words are from Voorhoeve (1975), as cited in the Trans-New Guinea database:

{| class="wikitable sortable"
! gloss !! Burmeso
|-
| head || agum
|-
| hair || ihiro
|-
| eye || jenar
|-
| tooth || araruro
|-
| leg || jago
|-
| louse || hati
|-
| dog || jamo
|-
| pig || sibo
|-
| bird || tohodo
|-
| egg || kohũp
|-
| blood || sar
|-
| bone || hiurap
|-
| skin || asi memiro
|-
| tree || haman
|-
| man || tamo
|-
| sun || misiavo
|-
| water || bau
|-
| fire || hor
|-
| stone || ako
|-
| name || ahau
|-
| eat || bomo
|-
| one || neisano
|-
| two || sor
|}

References

Further reading
Donohue, Mark. 2001. Animacy, class and gender in Burmeso. In: Pawley et al. (eds.), The Boy from Bundaberg: Studies in Melanesian Linguistics in Honour of Tom Dutton. Canberra: Pacific Linguistics.97–117.
Tasti, Markus and Mark Donohue. 1998. A Small Dictionary of Burmeso. Unpublished ms, University of Sydney.

Languages of western New Guinea
East Bird's Head languages
Unclassified languages of New Guinea